Ultra Mix may refer to:
Ultra-mix Universal Automation System 1995 Mackie audio mixing system for 8-bus consoles
Ultra Mix (Priority Records series), dance compilation by Universal Music from 1997
UltraMix (Ultra Records album series), Ultra Records series, dance compilation from 2010s, now part of Sony Entertainment
Ultra.Mix - Vic Latino (September 23, 2008)
Ultramix 2 - Vic Latino (September 22, 2009)
UltraMix 3 - (March 6, 2010)
Ultra Mix (Shonen Knife album)